The 1983 San Diego mayoral special election was held on May 3, 1983 to elect the mayor for San Diego. The special election was necessary due to former mayor Pete Wilson's resignation to take a seat in the United States Senate.

Municipal elections in California are officially non-partisan, though some candidates do receive funding and support from various political parties. The non-partisan primary was held March 15, 1983. Maureen O'Connor and Roger Hedgecock received the most votes and advanced to the May runoff. Hedgecock received a majority of the votes in the May election, and was elected mayor for the remainder of Wilson's term.

Pete Wilson resignation
In November 1982, San Diego Mayor Pete Wilson was elected to the United States Senate representing California. On January 3, 1983, Wilson resigned as mayor of San Diego to be sworn in as a senator. Deputy Mayor Bill Cleator served as acting mayor until an election could be held to fill the office for the remainder of Wilson's third term.

Candidates
Roger Hedgecock, San Diego County supervisor
Maureen O'Connor, former member of the San Diego City Council
Bill Cleator, member of the San Diego City Council and acting mayor
Bill Mitchell, member of the San Diego City Council
Rich Riel, businessman
Joe Jaffe, college student
Don Parker, businessman
Rosalyn, retired teacher and perennial candidate
George Hollis, optical manufacturer and engineer
William Armstrong, unemployed former police officer
Jim Cunradi, activist
Paul Clark, daycare school owner
Dan Russell, firefighter
Oren Cox, businessman
Jerry Shine, plastic injection molder
Alex Weaver, economist
John Yuskiw, potter and musician
Art Walters, singles group founder and leader
Leon Haake, marine engineering technician
Walter Sweadner, computer hardware service manager

Campaign
Four candidates with prior elected experience contested the special mayoral election. Former city council member Maureen O'Connor, a Democrat, was considered the early front-runner and likely to advance to a runoff election, if not win the first round outright. O'Connor's major opponents in the first round election included county supervisor Roger Hedgecock, city council member and acting mayor Bill Cleator, and city council member Bill Mitchell, all self-identified Republicans. In addition to the main four candidates, an additional 16 other candidates qualified for the ballot.

In her campaign, O'Connor proposed freezing utility rates, focusing on creating jobs, and improving public transportation. Hedgecock ran as a political moderate and emphasized environmental protection. Cleator positioned himself as a pro-business Republican, and he criticized Hedgecock as a renegade Republican.

On March 15, 1983, O'Connor came in first in the primary with 36.8 percent of the vote, followed by Hedgecock with 31.1 percent of the vote. Cleator finished in third with 25.6 percent of the vote. Mitchell, whose campaign never really took off, trailed behind in fourth with only 5.0 percent of the vote. None of the 16 minor candidates received more than 1 percent individually.

Because no candidate received a majority of the vote, O'Connor and Hedgecock advanced to a runoff election scheduled for May 3, 1983. Hedgecock ultimately prevailed in the runoff with 52.2 percent of the vote, and was elected mayor.

Primary election results

Runoff election results

References

1983
1983 California elections
California special elections
1983 United States mayoral elections
United States mayoral special elections
1980s in San Diego
May 1983 events in the United States